The League for Socialist Action was a small Trotskyist organisation in Britain.

It consisted of a group of members who split from the International Marxist Group in 1976 in support of the US Socialist Workers Party's tendency in the Fourth International.

Its publication, Socialist Action, was produced several times each year. Its pamphlets included Abortion a Woman's Right! (1975) ; The Labour Party (1976) ; and Revolution in the Americas (1981).

It engaged in entrism in the Labour Party after 1976, and merged with the International Marxist Group in 1982.

References

Fourth International (post-reunification)
Defunct Trotskyist organisations in the United Kingdom
International Marxist Group
Political parties established in 1976
Political parties disestablished in 1982
1976 establishments in the United Kingdom
Entryists